The 1985 Cup of the Soviet Army Final was the 3rd final of the Cup of the Soviet Army (as a secondary cup tournament in Bulgaria), and was contested between CSKA Sofia and Cherno More Varna on 1 June 1983 at Vasil Levski National Stadium in Sofia. CSKA won the final 4–0.

Match

Details

References

Football cup competitions in Bulgaria
1984–85 in Bulgarian football

PFC Cherno More Varna matches
PFC CSKA Sofia matches